François Weber (21 December 1898 – 27 January 1961) was a Luxembourgian footballer. He competed in the men's tournament at the 1928 Summer Olympics.

References

External links
 

1898 births
1961 deaths
Luxembourgian footballers
Luxembourg international footballers
Olympic footballers of Luxembourg
Footballers at the 1924 Summer Olympics
Footballers at the 1928 Summer Olympics
Sportspeople from Luxembourg City
Association football midfielders
CA Spora Luxembourg players